Winthrop Harbor is a station on Metra's Union Pacific North Line located in Winthrop Harbor, Illinois. It is located on 7th Street, one block east of Ravine Drive. In Metra's zone-based fare system, Winthrop Harbor is in zone I. As of 2018, Winthrop Harbor is the 206th busiest of Metra's 236 non-downtown stations, with an average of 59 weekday boardings.

Winthrop Harbor is located at grade level and has two side platforms that serve two tracks. It is the northernmost Metra Station in the State of Illinois. A parking lot is available on the west side of the station.

As of April 25, 2022, Winthrop Harbor is served by six trains in each direction on weekdays, by five inbound trains and seven outbound trains on Saturdays, and by three trains in each direction on Sundays.

References

Further reading

External links
Metra - Winthrop Harbor
Station from 7th Street from Google Maps Street View

Metra stations in Illinois
Former Chicago and North Western Railway stations
Railway stations in Lake County, Illinois
Union Pacific North Line